On This Perfect Day is the debut album by Arjen Anthony Lucassen's side project Guilt Machine, released in August 2009. The cover of the album was made by Christophe Dessaigne, an artist discovered by Arjen Lucassen on Flickr.

Album information
The album features several audio messages sent by fans throughout the songs. The music deals with "the destructive psychology of guilt, regret and the darkest form of secret -- the secrets we hide from ourselves.", and the music ranges "from dark and heavy to atmospheric and melancholic.", as can be noticed via the preview track published at the band's MySpace page.

Track listing

CD (all editions)
 All music by Arjen Anthony Lucassen, all lyrics by Lori Linstruth.

DVD (Limited and Special editions only)
 Audio Bonus Tracks
The Stranger Song (Leonard Cohen cover) - vocals Jasper (4:53)
Michelangelo (The 23rd Turnoff cover) - vocals Arjen (3:23)
Fan Messages (8:14)
Perfection? - guide vocals Arjen (9:37)
Twisted Coil - radio edit (4:17)
Pull me out of the Dark - radio edit (Green and Cream) (3:36)
Over - radio edit (3:56)
 
Video
Trailer "On this Perfect Day" (4:33)
Making of the Trailer (3:44)
Interview with Guilt Machine (40:03)

Reception 

Since its release, On This Perfect Day has received strongly favorable reviews. Elements that were praised included Steverlinck's voice and the dark atmosphere developed by Lucassen; Metal Storm considers it "the darkest and most melancholic [album] the Dutchman has ever released".

Metal Storm gave the album a rating of 9/10 while stating that the album enjoyed "a promising line-up" and "emotional vocal work that builds up intensity as it goes". Metal Underground remarked that it is "a bold combination of grit, beauty, and strong themes riding the line between progressive metal and rock". RevelationZ considers this album as "overall a great album and another worthy addition to the Lucassen catalogue."

Reviews differ about its similarity with Lucassen's previous works. Metal Storm stated, "from all of his side-projects, this is probably the one closest to Ayreon" and Dangerdog.com calls it "different, but the same". However, Sea of Tranquillity stated, "I'm sure there are going to be plenty of Ayreon fans who might balk at the overabundance of atmospheric and mellow moments here and miss the more upbeat and bombastic elements of Lucassen's other releases".

Personnel
 Guilt Machine
 Jasper Steverlinck – lead vocals
 Arjen Anthony Lucassen – rhythm and acoustic guitars, bass, keyboard, mandolin, backing vocals on all tracks, lead vocals on disc 2 track 2
 Lori Linstruth – lead guitar
 Chris Maitland – drums

 Guest Musicians
 Ben Mathot – violin
 David Faber – cello
 Additional vocals
 Rozemarijn, Stephan Venker, Ripley, Anonymous, Frederic Dessaigne, Rano Zangana, Masumi Hodgson, Jon Mellado, Ahlroos, Sen, Anonymous, Haydee Garde, Casper Sorensen, Andrew Hyslop, Jardar Folling, Pax, Vinicius TT1, Petho-Devay Ildiko, Claudia M. Luisa Murella – Spoken messages (in order of appearance)

 Production
 Arjen Anthony Lucassen – production, mixing
 Christophe Dessaigne – artwork photography
 Jasper van Tilburgh – band photos
 Thomas Ewerhard – logo and layout
 Peter Brussée – mastering

References

External links
 On This Perfect Day at Mascot Records

Guilt Machine albums
2009 debut albums
Mascot Records albums